The Ogdru Jahad are fictional supervillains in Mike Mignola's Hellboy comic series. They are the Dragon of Revelation, and are destined to end the world. Though the Ogdru Jahad are the central antagonists of the franchise, they are not active. Their release from imprisonment instead being the object of many other villains' plans, namely Mad Monk Grigori Rasputin and the Neo-Nazi Thule Society and former Merlinean sorceress turned evil  Nimue, the Blood Queen.   They were imprisoned in their Golden Cocoons by the Right Hand of Doom shortly after the creation of Earth, but not before they spawned 369 children, known as the Ogdru Hem.

Fictional character biography
Mostly inspired by the Great Old Ones of H. P. Lovecraft's Cthulhu Mythos (with some ancient Egyptian and Babylonian influences as well) the Ogdru Jahad are serpentine/crustacean entities which once resided on, and presided over, Earth. They are pitiless, chaotic, bent on destruction and subjugation and often so horrific in appearance that the mere sight of one of them sometimes induced madness.
They are listed as follows:

Amon-Jahad
Adad-Jahad
Namrat-Jahad
Irra-Jahad
Nunn-Jahad
Beuu-Jahad
Nergal-Jahad

Origins
In the beginning of time, God created an army of spirits. Of these, many of the greater spirits were sent to newborn Earth to oversee it as Watchers. After a time, one Watcher named Anum "...dared to take fire from the air, and with it, fashioned out of mud the dragon (...)". The Ogdru Jahad is thus made up of the four classical elements. The other Watchers set their seals on the Ogdru Jahad and yet the entities did not come to life until nightfall. By then, the awakened Ogdru Jahad are instilled with purpose and function as they instantly give birth to the Ogdru Hem, who become Earth's first lifeforms.

The Watchers, upon seeing the creation of these abominations, went to war with them. The Ogdru Hem were eventually all disposed of, with many of them barely clinging to existence in some fashion, with the Ogdru Jahad sealed by their creator in a prison of crystal and placed in the heart of the abyss. The other Watchers, however, turn on Anum and destroyed him. After that, God looked down in fury on what had happened, and exacted his retribution on the Watchers for botching their task: some were cast down into the pit, while others were stranded on Earth to breed monsters. Eventually, lesser spirits were given form by God and took up residence on Earth as the first men, the Golden People of Hyperborea.

As it turned out, Anum's right hand survived and was found by the Hyperboreans as it became a holy relic and was attached to a great statue at the behest of their king Thoth. Holding three Watchers captive in a secret garden, Thoth learned the inner workings of the universe and only shared a small fraction of his knowledge to the people. 10,000 years later, Hyperboria's downfall began when Hecate used Thoth to find the Watchers, drain them of their blood, and reveal all their secrets to the people. Though Thoth cursed Hecate in her serpentine form, her actions led to Hyperboria's corruption as they begin to worship the Black Goddess, one of many epithets that Hecate came to be called, and commit atrocities in her name. These actions led to the statue coming to life and slaughtering the many Hyperboreans before finally hurling itself over a cliff. The Last Glacial Period then enables the raise of humanity, the second race, while the Hyperboreans were divided into two groups. While one branch who gave their successors knowledge before departing, those among the Hyperboreans who continue to worship Hecate took refuge underground and became extinct at the hands of their corrupted slaves in their attempt to reclaim their former glory. Anum's hand eventually was recovered and ended up in Hell. As the hand is the key to freeing the Ogdru Jahad from their prison, which would usher in a new and final race of men, it came to be known as "the Right Hand of Doom".

Hellboy
When Hellboy was born, the Right Hand of Doom was grafted onto the newborn's arm by Azzael before being sent away from Hell and summoned to Earth years later by Rasputin. Hellboy is aware that he must keep the hand, as it would be more dangerous to try to rid himself of it. Attempts have already been made to separate Hellboy from his arm, both to protect the world and to hasten its destruction. Hellboy believes he is the best protection the arm can have.

While certain events have made it clear that the Right Hand of Doom is the Key to releasing the Ogdru Jahad, the actions of Herman von Klempt and the  monsters suggest that there are other conditions that need to be met. The summonings of the Conqueror Worm and Katha-Hem were meant to lead to the Ogdru Jahad's freedom, yet Hellboy's right hand had no role in these schemes and were thus considered doomed to failure. Even Nimue being possessed by the Ogdru Jahad to serve as their vessel and conduit to prematurely enter the world also ended in failure yet began the series of events that would conclude with the end of humanity.

By the end of B.P.R.D, Hell on Earth, the Ogdru Jahad are on the verge of victory, with one of them, namely Nunn-Jahad, landing on Earth, in Argent, Kansas devastating the surrounding area for miles. It immediately proceeded to spawn a number of Ogdru Hem as both the SSS and the B.P.R.D. mobilize to try to fight it. Elizabeth Sherman and Johann Kraus succeeded in destroying the Ogdru Hem but are unable to damage the dragon itself, forcing a retreat. Nunn-Jahad's arrival also connected it to the psychic network that powers The Black Flame. After the Black Flame is defeated, Nunn-Jahad begins moving, bringing with it a storm of fire and lightning. It proceeded to spew out dozens more Ogdru Hem by the hour, overwhelming Liz and Johann's attempts to stymie the tide. The US military tries to fire every available nuclear warhead at it, but without any effect. It eventually passes by B.P.R.D. headquarters and destroys it with a fireball that kills Katherine Corrigan and Panya. Afterwards it was confronted by several Watchers from Hell, who have been summoned by the demon Varvara; however, despite their efforts, the Ogdru Jahad incinerated them. Nunn-Jahad was finally killed when Johann channels the infinite power of Vril to shatter it, sacrificing himself in the process. With its death, Ogdru Hem around the globe cease moving or showing any signs of life, giving the world a bit of a breather.

The Ogdru Jahad was finally killed after Hellboy died and the Ogdru Hem took over the world. The Osiris Club used Hellboy's severed right hand to "reach out into the void, seize the Dragons in their cocoons, and bring it hurtling toward Earth". The impact killed the Ogdru Jahad and all the Ogdru Hem, with the spirits of the Ogdru Jahad being absorbed into the hand and siphoned into the Osiris Club members to make them gods. Hellboy's spirit reclaimed his hand before the transfer could be completed, killing the Club members and possibly resurrecting Hellboy. The prophecy about the Ogdru Jahad burning the Earth and then remaking it anew was fulfilled by Hellboy, Hecate, and Liz. The latter burned everything on the Earth's surface and seemingly killed herself, and Hellboy climbed into Hecate's Iron Maiden form, causing his blood to spread life all across the planet and repopulate it with members of Abe Sapien's species. Hecate and Hellboy presumably ruled over the new world.

Motivations
From the varied attempts of the comic's villains to free the Ogdru Jahad, it is readily apparent that the release of the Ogdru Jahad is closely tied to the fall of mankind. Whether the fall of man causes the release or quickly follows it is not known with any certainty. All the characters attempting to liberate it agree that the Ogdru Jahad will do something akin to "burning the earth to a cinder" so it is possible they are all referring to some common vision of the dragon's release but are guessing at how the prophecy is fulfilled.

Immortal and vastly powerful beyond description, sometimes referred to as a single entity, the Ogdru Jahad's motivations may be impossible to represent in human terms. As such, the human and quasi-human inhabitants of the Hellboy universe have expressed a variety of opinions on what the Ogdru Jahad desire beyond freedom, which it desires above all other things.

Beyond the basic premise of seeking freedom and then burning the earth, there is much dissent as to precisely what the Ogdru Jahad desire. The aliens that watch the cosmic prison of the Ogdru Jahad apparently perceive Earth as a focal point necessary to maintaining the prison. If the Ogdru Jahad are released, they will destroy Earth and then the entire Universe. Herman von Klempt believes that once man has been destroyed, the three hundred and sixty-nine Ogdru Hem will rise up from their prisons, free the Ogdru Jahad and burn the Earth to ashes. Similarly, the Bog Roosh was plagued with dreams in which Hellboy's hand is taken and used to free the Ogdru Jahad, who then burn the earth to cinders. Rasputin, on the other hand, seems convinced that the desire of the Ogdru Jahad is to create a new, perfect world out of the ashes of the old one, where the final race of man will live. He tells Inger von Klempt that her grandfather was unable to see beyond the destruction of the human race, and that a new Eden does indeed await the final race of man. Hecate also strongly implies that there will be a "new world to come" during a conversation with Rasputin in the Conqueror Worm epilogue, but mentions that she cannot see that far ahead, and that death could await them just as easily. In The Third Wish, the Daoine Sidhe explicitly state that it is prophesied that a new world shall rise from the old due to the Right Hand of Doom.

Mortal agents
After being imprisoned in the void, the Ogdru Jahad turned their considerable forces toward finding a way to escape their confinement and exact their revenge on the world. Since they are trapped in deep space, their contact with humanity is sparse at best.

Herman von Klempt
In Austria in 1939, the Nazis attempted to open relations with space-borne monsters by sending them the corpse of one of their greatest scientists, Dr. Ernst Oeming, in the hopes that the creatures would use it as a vessel and return to Earth. On March 20, 1939, even though the mission, which took place at Hunte Castle, was interrupted by the arrival of  Johnson and a detachment of American soldiers, the launch went ahead as planned. The castle, however, was left in ruins, and all parties were killed except for Herman von Klempt. The creatures received the spacecraft, and responded by placing one of their own inside Oeming's lifeless body.

After the events of Wake the Devil, Herman von Klempt is provided with the truth about the Oeming mission and the details of the return of the capsule. The invisible space monsters showed von Klempt the destruction that would result from releasing the worm they had planted within Oeming's body. Once the world had been overtaken by the worm, the Ogdru Hem would be released from their prisons, and they would, in turn, release the Ogdru Jahad, who will reduce the world to ashes.  Despairing over the failures of his best laid plans, and inspired by Rasputin posing as the angel of death, von Klempt returned to Hunte Castle and set to work.

Von Klempt succeeded in bringing Oeming's capsule back to Earth, and from it rose a massive juggernaut known as the Conqueror Worm.  Spewing forth a noxious gas, the worm turned von Klempt's human agents into  monsters, then devoured them immediately to feed its insatiable hunger.  Only quick intervention by Hellboy and Roger the Homunculus, aided by the ghost of  Johnson and a mysterious alien, managed to halt the worm's feasting march. Herman von Klempt watched in dismay as his plans were foiled, only to be grabbed by Roger and heaved off a cliff to his death. But Von Klempt's head survived, retrieved by Landis Pope of the Zinco Corporation before being spirited away by Kroenen and then revived by Varvara.

Rasputin

After being poisoned, shot, stabbed, clubbed, castrated, and hurled into the icy waters of the Neva, Rasputin was contacted by the Ogdru Jahad. They sent him visions explaining their nature and what they wanted from him, namely, to release them from their prison, help bring about the end of the world, and make way for a new world. Uncertain of how to proceed, Rasputin waited to be contacted again.

Eventually, after years of silence and waiting, Rasputin was approached by Heinrich Himmler, head of the Schutzstaffel of Nazi Germany. Recognizing this as an opportunity to acquire the resources needed to establish a stronger connection to the Ogdru Jahad, Rasputin joined forces with the Nazis and soon assembled a team of Nazi occultists, consisting primarily of Ilsa Haupstein, Leopold Kurtz, and Prof. Doktor Karl Ruprecht Kroenen. This team was known as Project Ragna Rok. On December 23, 1944, Rasputin and his colleagues opened a doorway into the void, and Hellboy was brought forth, albeit unbeknownst to the Nazis (but not to Rasputin). After this apparent failure, the Allies won World War II and Rasputin and his allies scattered. Rasputin himself traveled to a hidden temple in the distant Arctic dedicated to the Ogdru Jahad. Inside, he sat at the foot of a statue of Sadu Hem for almost fifty years until he was disturbed by  Bruttenholm, providing a catalyst for his, and Sadu Hem's, sudden re-awakenings. Ilsa, Kroenen, and Kurtz relocated to the frigid north of Norway and cryogenically froze themselves until Rasputin's return, though they did not revive themselves until after Rasputin's failure at Cavendish Hall.
In the film, Rasputin was sucked into the portal and was seemingly destroyed, not to be seen again for 60 years. Only 2 members of the Nazis occultist team, Ilsa Haupstein and Kroenen survived.

In Wake the Devil, while trying to strike back at Hellboy by using Ilsa's connection to a Romanian vampire, Rasputin brings Hellboy into the clutches of the Hecate. Hecate threatens Hellboy with his destiny, and in the end Hellboy prevails. Retreating to the abode of his grandmother, Baba Yaga, Rasputin tries to come to terms with the fact that the Ogdru Jahad manipulated him. He realizes that the Ogdru Jahad were behind his latest venture, though he alone is responsible for the failure. He also must deal with the fact that rather than saving Ilsa, he instead sacrificed her to Hecate, who would use Ilsa's corpse (and the iron maiden that contained it) as her new body.

Moreover, Hecate tells Rasputin that he had no hope in trying to awake the Dragon in the events of Seed of Destruction - the only power that can free the Ogdru Jahad is Hellboy's right hand, and Rasputin is nothing more than a tool with which to manipulate and maneuver Hellboy. Upon hearing this, Rasputin loses control and attacks Hecate, who virtually destroys him, leaving nothing more than a tiny shard of his soul for the Baba Yaga to preserve in an acorn shell.

Eventually, Varvara resurrected her father, who attempted to free the Ogdru Jahad again. He awakened all the Ogdru Hem around the globe. The creatures devastated humanity, who managed to escape through underground tunnels. Rasputin battled Hellboy, Abe Sapien, and Liz Sherman, killing Abe. He referred to himself as the Ogdru Jahad on Earth and tore off Hellboy's right hand, mortally wounding him. Hellboy transformed into a full demon and snapped Rasputin's neck, killing him for good.

Nimue
A former love of Merlin before she used his knowledge to imprison him in his grave, Nimue lost her mind and became a devout worshipper of the Ogdru Jahad before the other witches killed her and eventually placed her severed body parts in a box that is buried within the earth. However, during the power vacuum caused by Hecate being removed from power, Gruagach had the witches allow him to revive Nimue to be their new leader. But Nimue exacts her revenge on the witches who imprisoned her and abandoned Grugach as she prepares to wage war on the world. However, Nimue would later learn that she became a vessel for the Ogdru Jahad in their attempt to prematurely enter the world through her. When possessing Nimue, the Ogdru Jahad could speak . During its fight with Hellboy, the Ogdru Jahad seemed very arrogant and considered the world its birthright. It was also very malicious and sadistic, as it purposefully unleashed a storm that killed thousands and taunted Hellboy about his inability to stop it. In this from, the Ogdru Jahad referred to itself as one being. Hellboy eventually managed to kill it using Excalibur. However, he was killed by Nimue's ghost and dragged to Hell.

The role of the "Frog Monsters"
As the Ogdru Jahad advance their plans on Earth, it becomes evident that they intend to transform humanity into a new "final" race of man. The attempts are seen in the Frog Monsters that were first seen in Seed of Destruction and then again in Conqueror Worm and B.P.R.D.: A Plague of Frogs, creatures strong enough to overpower Hellboy and can assume human form. Moreover, the frogmen can exert a degree of telepathic influence over their victims, confusing them with illusions and mind-tricks. These creatures also possess souls, that create a corrupting influence on living beings. If they pass on, a creature seems to devour their ectasic spirits. Whether this being is the Ogdru Jahad or something else entirely is uncertain.

The frogmen are linked to the Ogdru Jahad, and are being employed to free the Ogdru Hem who were imprisoned by the Watchers at the beginning of time. Once the Ogdru Hem are free, the Ogdru Jahad will follow. Currently, due to the events in A Plague of Frogs, numerous frogmen have escaped the clutches of the B.P.R.D. and are moving across the North American countryside. These nests seem constructed around the purpose of praying to the Ogdru Hem and, in certain locations, obtain relics and items which spawn vicious and lethal Ogdru-Hem-like creatures. Moreover, the frogs have transcended their human limitations and have developed the ability to convert their bodies to biological factories, producing thousands of tadpoles which become  monsters.

After the events of B.P.R.D.: The Black Flame, it appeared that the  monsters have been dealt a major setback but, as seen in B.P.R.D.: The Warning and B.P.R.D.: The Black Goddess, the creatures regrouped and allied themselves with the subterranean race from B.P.R.D.: The Hollow Earth. In B.P.R.D.: King of Fear, it is revealed that the  monsters were flawed attempts to create the next race of men, with Abe Sapien also learning that he is actually a perfected version of the creatures. The frogs are driven to extinction at the peak of this revelation when Liz Sherman unleashes her powers in an explosion that incinerates the Hollow Earth. In the subsequent "Hell on Earth" cycle, it is revealed that Zinco Corporation held the last few living frogs, however they too are wiped out when the remnants of Project Ragnarok inadvertently resurrect the Black Flame at Zinco headquarters. At the end of The Devil You Know,  Abe Sapien's descendants replaced mankind (who had left the surface world for the safety of the Hollow Earth) as the dominant species.

In other media

Film
In the 2004 film Hellboy, the Ogdru Jahad were mentioned by name only twice by Rasputin. They were portrayed as massive, indistinct, draconian or cephalopod-like creatures encased in crystal shells. They are referred to by him as the seven gods of chaos who will destroy the world and from its ashes "a new Eden will arise". At the conclusion of the film, their prisons were shattered and the Ogdru Jahad began their assault on Earth. Before the final lock could be released by Hellboy, he regained his senses and the Ogdru Jahad disappeared.

Sammael, a demon in the film, was referred to as the "son of Nergal"; hinting the monster to be one of the Ogdru Hem through Nergal-Jahad. The giant Behemoth, the "god" Rasputin answers to and appears at the end of the film resembles the Ogdru Hem known as Sadu-Hem.

Animated
In Hellboy: Sword of Storms, the Ogdru Jahad (or possibly Ogdru Hem) made a cameo as the brothers of Thunder and Lightning. Though not mentioned by name, they were referred to as the "Dragons".

See also
 B.P.R.D.: The Soul of Venice and Other Stories
 Deep One
 Demons
 The Darkest of the Hillside Thickets released a song titled "Ogdru Jahad," a tribute to the Ogdru Jahad and the Hellboy comic on their 1995 album Cthulhu Strikes Back.

References

Fictional demons and devils
Fictional dragons
Fictional monsters
Hellboy characters
Characters created by Mike Mignola